Small World is a 2010 Franco-German drama film directed by Bruno Chiche and adapted from the book Small World by Martin Suter.

Synopsis 
Conrad Lang is the handyman of a wealthy family. He grew up as the brother of Thomas, the family son who is the same age. Conrad accidentally sets fire to the large holiday home of which he was the guardian. He then returns to the city of his childhood, on the wedding day of Phillipe (son of Thomas) and Simone. Memory problems and repeated behavior quickly reveal neurological disease to Conrad, which brings Elvira, Thomas' stepmother, to install him with a nurse in the home of a friend.

Cast

Festival 
The film premiered at the Marrakech International Film Festival, 10 December 2010.

References

External links 
 

2010 films
2010 drama films
2010s French-language films
French drama films
German drama films
2010s French films
2010s German films